Zapped is a British television sitcom, set in both the real world and a fantasy world, with the majority of characters and stories wholly set in the latter. It stars James Buckley as Brian Weaver, a real world inhabitant who becomes trapped in Munty, a town in the fantasy world.

Buckley announced during a live stream on 8 February 2019 that the show had been cancelled and he would not be making any more episodes.

In February 2021, all episodes of the show were added to BBC iPlayer.

Plot
Brian is an office worker in West London who reluctantly takes delivery of a package addressed to someone in a place called Munty. He opens it, puts on the amulet within, and is teleported to the medieval setting of Munty. The three episodes of series one focus on his attempts to get back to the real world. He is not missed by his real world colleagues, who detest him.

Setting
Munty is a place in a fantasy universe, where magic is a real force, but one closely controlled by a police state. The enforcers of the state are "fairies", who are the opposite of the traditional image of the fairy - they are big, burly, thuggish men.

The stories are mostly set in and around the town pub (The Jug and the Other Jug) and a nearby shop. They revolve around Brian's attempts to get home and his interactions with his newfound friends.  Brian does not gel with his new surroundings and does not fit in, notably remaining in his real world clothes throughout.

Cast and characters

Main characters
 James Buckley as Brian Weaver, a former office worker and loser from the real world who is now trapped in Munty.
 Louis Emerick as Herman, the landlord and only barkeep of a tavern in Munty where most of the series takes place. Herman is a retired swordsman and veteran of the Mage Wars, and still keeps the heads of ogres and unicorns he killed on the walls of the tavern.
 Kenneth Collard as Steg Steggson, a half-giant half-dwarf Munty resident, and one of Herman's few regular patrons. Steg considers himself a 'champion of the people' and a force for progress and social justice, although the causes he regularly takes up are often ridiculous or inconsequential.
 Paul Kaye as Howell, a disgraced former grand wizard who now owns a magic emporium near to the tavern, which he frequently visits. Howell funds his substance abuse issues and alcoholism with various dodgy schemes.
 Sharon Rooney as Barbara, another tavern regular, is an apprentice soothsayer with an unrequited affection for Brian. A running joke is that her predictions and prophecies often initially appear vastly incompetent, but actually turn out true in the end, although nobody realises.

Recurring and supporting characters
 Steve Coogan as Feffenhoffer, a sadistic circus master.
 Phil Daniels as the Warden of the Pear Orchard.
 Kathryn Drysdale as Lorelei, a mermaid.
 Tim FitzHigham as Fenton Breem, Munty's premier musician and playwright.
 Martin Glyn Murray as Greg. 
 Ricky Grover as Hawthorn, a fairy.
 Miranda Hennessy as Effandra.
 Tim Key as Sextus.
 Guz Khan as Skylark, a fairy.
 Sylvester McCoy as The Protector.
 Sally Phillips as Slasher Morgan, a criminal who often deals with Howell.
 Jessica Ransom as Jess, a real world office worker.
Rufus Hound as Kevlar.
 Richard Sandling as Springleaf, a fairy. 
 Nina Wadia as the Judge.
 Tony Way as Chestnut, a fairy.
 Susan Wokoma as Rina.

Episodes

Series 1 (2016)

Series 2 (2017)
On 12 April 2017, it was announced that Zapped had been renewed for a second series of six episodes, to be broadcast starting 12 October 2017.

Series 3 (2018)

References

External links

2016 British television series debuts
2018 British television series endings
2010s British sitcoms
British fantasy television series
Dave (TV channel) original programming
English-language television shows